Mann is a 1957 Nepali novel by Leeladhwaj Thapa. It was published in 1957 by Sajha Prakashan. It is the third novel of the writer who had previously wrote Shanti and Purvasmriti. It won the Madan Puraskar for the same year. The book was reprinted by Book Hill Publication on December 04, 2020.

Synopsis 
The book is set in 2012-2013 BS. Mann is the lead character of the book who gets pregnant with Master Hridaya Raj who abandon her. The book shows the struggle of Mann in a patriarchal society and the challenges she faces in her life.

Reception 
The book was the first novel to won the Madan Puraskar 1957 (2014 BS). Madan Puraskar was first awarded in 1956 (2013 BS) to three non-fiction books, Hamro Lok Sanskriti by Satya Mohan Joshi, General Bhimsen Thapa Ra Tatkalin Nepal by Chittaranjan Nepali and Adhikbibhav Sthirbidhoot Utpadhak by Balram Joshi.

See also 

 Basain
 Shirishko Phool
 Sumnima

References 

Nepalese books
1957 novels
Nepalese novels
Madan Puraskar-winning works
20th-century Nepalese books
20th-century Nepalese novels
Cultural depictions of Nepalese women
1957 Nepalese novels
Novels set in Nepal
Nepali-language novels